This is a list of diplomatic missions of Mali.

Africa

 Algiers (Embassy)
 Tamanghasset  (Consulate)

 Luanda (Embassy)

 Ouagadougou  (Embassy)

 Douala (Consulate-General)

 Cairo (Embassy)

 Malabo (Embassy)

 Addis Ababa (Embassy)

 Libreville (Embassy)

 Accra (Embassy)

 Conakry (Embassy)

 Abidjan (Embassy)
 Bouaké (Consulate)

 Tripoli (Embassy)

 Nouakchott (Embassy)

 Rabat (Embassy)

 Niamey (Consulate-General)

 Abuja (Embassy)

 Kigali (Embassy)

 Dakar (Embassy)

 Pretoria (Embassy)

 Khartoum (Consulate-General)

 Tunis (Embassy)

Americas

 Brasilia (Embassy)

 Ottawa (Embassy)

 Havana (Embassy)

 Washington, D.C. (Embassy)

Asia

 Beijing (Embassy)
 Guangzhou (Consulate-General)

 New Delhi (Embassy)

 Tehran (Embassy)

 Tokyo (Embassy)

 Kuwait City (Embassy)

 Doha (Embassy)

 Riyadh (Embassy)
 Jeddah (Consulate)

 Ankara (Embassy)

 Abu Dhabi (Embassy)

Europe

 Brussels (Embassy)

 Paris (Embassy)

 Berlin (Embassy)

 Rome (Embassy)

 Moscow (Embassy)

 Madrid (Embassy)

Multilateral organisations

Brussels (Delegation to the European Union)

Geneva (Delegation to the United Nations)
New York City (Representation to the United Nations)

Gallery

See also
 Foreign relations of Mali
 List of diplomatic missions in Mali

References

External links
 Ministry of Foreign Affairs and International Cooperation of the Republic of Mali

 
Mali
Diplomatic missions